Random Encounters is an American musical web series co-created by AJ Pinkerton and Peter Srinivasan. The series' first official short, "Singachu: A Pikachu Song", premiered on YouTube on June 7, 2011. Since launching, the series has partnered with Disney Digital Network, Maker Studios, and at one point with IGN Entertainment.

Each regular Random Encounters musical consists of an original song number (mostly performed by live costumed actors recreating scenes or starring as characters from a popular video game series, such as Super Mario Bros., Pokémon or Five Nights at Freddy's). The creators were first inspired to found the series in 2010, when their Sonic the Hedgehog musical parody won the grand prize in an international video competition hosted by Sega.

Random Encounters has previously performed some of their songs live at events.

History
"Random Encounters" was initially conceived during a Sega-sponsored contest, for which Andrew John (AJ) Pinkerton co-developed the winning entry and his first video game parody song, "Needlemouse: The Musical". The Needlemouse song was requested by Sega to be performed live at their 2011 Sonic Boom community event, where AJ Pinkerton and Peter Srinivasan first recognized the demand for their product and began development on a series of popular games such as musical numbers.

Style
Random Encounters music videos are generally family-friendly and often written to be cleverly self-censored, such as utilizing creative alternatives to obscenities and disregarding the rhyming scheme abruptly to dodge profanity. Shorts based on mature content, such as Assassin's Creed, Five Nights at Freddy's and Dead Space, typically present light-hearted versions of the characters, rather than their colder in-game incarnations.

Musical styles for each short vary but often consist of bouncy rhythms and upbeat tempos. Some songs borrow heavily from other sources, such as Disney numbers or in-game themes. The series' derives much of its humor from each song's lyrics, which often refer to in-game events, pop culture or internet memes.

While most videos are performed with live-action setups, some songs feature 2D, 3D, and stopmotion animation.

Musicals

Games
 "Singachu: A Pikachu Song" (based on Pokémon)
 "Needlemouse: The Musical" (based on Sonic the Hedgehog)
 "The Legend of Ganondorf" (based on The Legend of Zelda)
 "The Big The Cat Song" (based on Sonic the Hedgehog)
 "Pac-Man The Musical" (based on Pac-Man)
 "Nicole: A Dead Space Song" (based on Dead Space)
 "We Hate Green Pigs: An Angry Birds Song" (based on Angry Birds)
 "Nothing is True" (based on Assassin's Creed)
 "O Meta Knight" (based on Kirby)
 "Like John" (based on Mass Effect)
 "The Eggbot Bop" (based on Sonic the Hedgehog)
 "Sega Bass Fishing of the Dead" (based on Sega Bass Fishing)
 "The Best We Can Be" (based on Super Princess Peach)
 "One-Winged Office" (based on Final Fantasy VII)
 "The Magikarp Song" (based on Pokémon)
 "Rhythm Thief: The Musical" (based on Rhythm Thief & the Emperor's Treasure)
 "Tetris: The Musical" (based on Tetris)
 "The K. Rool Way" (based on Donkey Kong)
 "Pikmin the Musical: Cuteness in Major Thirds" (based on Pikmin)
 ""MEDIC!" A Team Fortress 2 Song" (based on Team Fortress 2)
 "Ganon Claus" (based on The Legend of Zelda)
 "We Wish You a Merry Creeper: A Minecraft Christmas Carol" (based on Minecraft)
 "Super Monkey Ball: The Musical" (based on Super Monkey Ball)
 "The Wario Rap" (based on Wario)
 "Companion Cube: A Portal Song" (based on Portal)
 "The Eevee Song: A Pokémon Jazz Number" (based on Pokémon)
 "Don't Let Me Go: A Yoshi Song" (based on Yoshi)
 "Minesweeper: The Musical" (based on Minesweeper)
 "Tricked By the Eggman: A Knuckles Rap" (based on Sonic the Hedgehog)
 "Arkham Origins Rock Opera" (based on Arkham Origins)
 "Pokémon University" (based on Pokémon)
 "Legends of Zelda: Tales of the Wind Waker" (based on The Legend of Zelda: The Wind Waker)
 "Dance of the Sugar Plum Clefairy" (based on Pokémon)
 "The Flag Pole Song" (based on Super Mario 3D World)
 "The Enderman Song" (based on Minecraft)
 "The Power of Pong: A Star Wars Rap" (based on Pong)
 "Phantom of the Mushroom Kingdom" (based on Super Mario Bros. 2)
 "My Date with Captain Falcon" (based on the F-Zero series)
 "Hyrule Warrior's Heart (The Legend of Zelda Parody Song)" (based on Hyrule Warriors)
 "Resident Enis" and "Resident Enis: Monster Gulch" (original productions)
 "Sonic Boom the Musical" (based on Sonic Boom: Rise of Lyric)
 "Captain Toad: Treasure Tracker - The Musical" (based on Captain Toad: Treasure Tracker)
 "The Three Days of Clock Town: A Zelda Christmas Song (Majora's Mask 3DS Parody)" (based on The Legend of Zelda: Majora's Mask)
 "The Zubat Song" (based on Pokémon)
 "Cubone <3 Mudkip: A Pokémon Love Song" (based on Pokémon)
 "MEDICS DON'T HEAL SCOUTS!" (based on Team Fortress 2)
 "StreetPass Love" (based on StreetPass)
 "Paperboy: The Musical" (based on Paperboy)
 "The People of Smash Bros." (based on Super Smash Bros. U)
 "Five Nights at Freddy's the Musical: Nights 1, 2, 3, 4, and 5", along with the "Supercut" or "Complete Edition" (based on Five Nights at Freddy's)
 "Octodad: The Musical'" (based on Octodad)
 "Bowser's Castle: A Super Mario Maker Song" (based on Super Mario Maker)
 "A Slender Song: Lost in the Woods" (based on Slender: The Eight Pages)
 "The Vaults of Fallout" (based on Fallout 4)
 "Shovel Knight: A Christmas Carol" (based on Shovel Knight)
 "The Three Fates of Undertale" (based on the three playable routes of Undertale, the neutral, pacifist, and genocide route)
 "Fran Bow: Finding Mr. Midnight" (based on Fran Bow)
 "Senpai Notice Me" (based on Yandere Simulator)
 "Samus the Spaceman Cowboy" (based on Metroid)
 "GO GO, POKÉMON GO!" (based on Pokémon Go)
 "Onix the Rock Snake" (based on Pokémon)
 "Determined to the End" (based on Undertale)
 "Team Full of Harmony" (based on Pokémon Go)
 "Everything's a Puzzle" (based on the Professor Layton series)
 "Best Fiends Forever: Song of the Slugs" (based on and sponsored by Best Fiends Forever)
 "FNAF: Blood and Tears" (based on Five Nights at Freddy's: Sister Location)
 "Alola Form for Me" (based on Pokémon Sun and Moon)
 "Tingle Bells" (based on The Legend of Zelda)
 "Phoenix Wright the Musical: The Turnabout Encounter" (based on Phoenix Wright: Ace Attorney)
 "HuniePop the Musical" (based on HuniePop)
 "Hello Neighbor: What's In Your Basement" (based on Hello Neighbor)
 "No More Mama" (based on Tattletail)
 "Favorite Fiends" (based on Best Fiends)
 "ARMS of a Fighter" (based on ARMS)
 "Bendy and the Ink Musical" (based on Bendy and the Ink Machine)
 "Kindergarten: The Musical" (based on Kindergarten)
 "Papers Please: The Musical" (based on Papers Please)
 "Friday the 13th: The Musical" (based on Friday the 13th: The Game)
 "My Own Little Nightmare" (based on Little Nightmares)
 "Up on My Housetop: A Hello Neighbor Christmas Song" (based on Hello Neighbor)
 "Don't Starve: The Musical" (based on Don't Starve)
 "Just Monika: A DDLC Song" (based on Doki Doki Literature Club!)
 "Cuphead the Musical" (based on Cuphead)
 "Detective Pikachu the Musical" (based on Detective Pikachu)
 "Let Me Go" (based on Granny)
 "Baldi's Basics: The Musical" (based on Baldi's Basics in Education and Learning)
 "You & Me" (based on Team Fortress 2)
 "FNAF: Ground Zero" (based on Freddy Fazbear's Pizzeria Simulator)
 "NUMBER ONE" (based on Fortnite)
 "Baldi's Field Trip: The Musical" (based on Baldi's Basics in Education and Learning)
 "Baldi's Big Zoo" (based on Baldi's Basics in Education and Learning)
 "Legendary Heroes: A Deltarune Song" (based on Deltarune)
 "Stranger Things Have Happened: A Sally Face song" (based on Sally Face)
 "Sonic the Hedgehog: The Musical Movie Trailer" (based on Sonic the Hedgehog (2020))
 "Super Mario Bros.: The Musical" (based on Super Mario Bros.)
 "Keep Talking and Nobody Explodes: The Musical" (based on Keep Talking and Nobody Explodes)
 "Kindergarten 2: The Musical" (based on Kindergarten 2)
 "Plants vs. Zombies: The Musical" (based on Plants vs. Zombies)
 "FNAF: Web of Lies" (based on Five Nights at Freddy's: Help Wanted)
 "Luigi's Mansion: The Musical" (based on Luigi's Mansion)
 "THE DAY THAT YOU DIE: A Little Misfortune Song" (based on Little Misfortune)
 "I SEE YOU: A Granny Chapter 2 Song" (based on Granny: Chapter Two)
 "Nana Knows the Ending: A Mr. Hopp's Playhouse song" (based on Mr. Hopp's Playhouse)
 "COOKING MAMA: The Musical" (based on Cooking Mama)
 "TOO SLOW (from Sonic the Hedgehog: The Movie Trailer)" (based on Sonic the Hedgehog)
 "GOOSE ON HOLIDAY: An Untitled Goose Game Song" (based on Untitled Goose Game)
 "CUPHEAD THE MUSICAL: REanimated! (feat. Markiplier & NateWantsToBattle)" (based on Cuphead)
 "GOD OF WAR: THE MUSICAL" (based on God of War)
 "ICE SCREAM MAN: An Ice Scream Song" (based on Ice Scream)
 "THE DEATH OF A SIM" (based on The Sims 4)
 "60 SECONDS! THE MUSICAL" (based on 60 Seconds!)
 "ICE SCREAM FUN" (based on Ice Scream)
 "EMERGENCY MEETING" (based on Among Us)
 "SPOOKY'S JUMP SCARE MUSICAL" (based on Spooky's Jump Scare Mansion)
 "PHASMOPHOBIA: THE MUSICAL" (based on Phasmophobia)
 "THE CHILD" (based on Granny)
"FRUIT NINJA: THE MUSICAL" (based on Fruit Ninja)
"THE C+ SHANTY: An Animal Crossing Song" (based on Animal Crossing: New Horizons)
"FRIDAY NIGHT FUNKIN' THE MUSICAL" (based on Friday Night Funkin')
"two: A Little Nightmares II Song" (based on Little Nightmares II)
"A PROPER END: A Stanley Parable Song" (based on The Stanley Parable)
"Your Happy Ending: A Mr. Hopp's Playhouse 2 Song" (based on Mr. Hopp's Playhouse 2)
"BENDY AND THE WOLF" (feat. MatPat) (based on Bendy and the Ink Machine)
"Secret" (feat. Kevin Clark) (based on 12 Minutes)
"His Perfect Playhouse: A Mr. Hopp Song" (based on Mr. Hopp's Manor Escape)
"A Hat in Time: The Musical" (based on A Hat in Time)
"NOELLE: A Deltarune Song" (based on Deltarune)
"BLASTING OFF AGAIN! A Team Rocket Song" (based on Pokémon)
"BETTER: An Uncharted / Tomb Raider Song" (based on Uncharted and Tomb Raider)
"ENGINEERS ARE YOUR FRIEND: A Team Fortress 2 Song (based on Team Fortress 2)
"RAVEN BROOKS: A Hello Neighbor 2 Song (based on Hello Neighbor 2)
"THE DISGAEA 6 COMPLETE MUSICAL (based on Disgaea 6: Defiance of Destiny)
"FNAF: The Monster In Your Head" (based on Five Nights at Freddy's: Security Breach)

April Fools videos
Beginning in 2015, Random Encounters has consistently made clickbait-style videos and uploaded them on April Fools Day pretending that they are new musicals or series installments; while most are not musical in nature, original music was written for: 
 "DO THE JUMP SCARE starring Trash and the Gang" (based on Ultimate Custom Night, uploaded as "FNAF The Musical: Ultimate Custom Night")
 "MARIO & SONIC AT THE OLYMPIC GAMES" (based on Mario & Sonic at the Olympic Games)
 "REJECTED KONGS: A New DK Rap" (based on Donkey Kong)

Other
 "The Brony Song" (based on My Little Pony: Friendship is Magic)
 "This Isn't a Car" (based on The Dark Knight Rises)
 "Why Not Wii U" (based on Nintendo's Wii U)
 "The Amiibo Song" (based on Nintendo's amiibo)
 "The Brony Song 2" (based on My Little Pony: Friendship is Magic)
 "Lolcats the Musical" (based on lolcats memes)
 "E3: The Musical" (based on the Electronic Entertainment Expo)
 "The Console Wars Musical" (based on the Xbox One, Wii U and PlayStation 4)
 "Muffins the Musical: A Derpy Hooves Song" (based on My Little Pony: Friendship is Magic)
 "Godzilla the Musical" (based on Godzilla)
 "Wario Wrecks E3" (based on the WarioWare series)
 "How to Beat a Monkey at Chess" (in collaboration with Fox Home Video and the film Russell Madness)

Primary actors
AJ Pinkerton is the co-founder, main writer, and director of Random Encounters, in addition to frequently starring as both male and female characters. AJ is typically eccentric and energetic and is particularly known for playing the titular Enis in the "Resident Enis" series. His other notable roles include Pikachu (in numerous videos),  both Bonnie Bunny and Purple Guy in the Five Nights at Freddy's musicals, and the entire cast of the Kindergarten musical.
Nathan "Nate" Morse is a primary actor, editor, and producer for Random Encounters. He co-created the very first RE song, "Needlemouse: The Musical", and appeared in it as Dr. Eggman and Knuckles, but remained relatively uninvolved with RE for the next five years before returning full time in July 2016. His most popular appearances include starring roles as both Granny and Baldi, as well as continuing to play Dr. Eggman in several Sonic the Hedgehog videos. In 2016, Nate created and starred in a comedic game review series, "The Shovelwarewolf." The series has since expanded to become a seasonal feature of Random Encounters.
Gwendolyn "Gwen" Pinkerton, formerly Gwendolyn Saltzman, is a primary actor for Random Encounters and, as of October 2018, the wife of AJ Pinkerton. Gwen has appeared in RE musicals since 2016, playing the characters of Info-chan, Six, and Team Rocket's Jessie in musicals based on Yandere Simulator, Little Nightmares, and Pokémon, respectively. Since officially joining the RE cast, Gwen has made notable performances as Yuri in "Just Monika: A DDLC Song" and as Playtime in "Baldi's Basics: The Musical," and was cast in the starring role in RE's Granny-inspired song, "Let Me Go." In the second season of the RE gaming series, "The Shovelwarewolf," Gwen was cast as the titular character's psychiatrist, appearing in all six episodes. AJ and Gwen began their relationship soon after her appearance in RE's Yandere Simulator musical.

Former cast
Peter Srinivasan is Random Encounters' former digital effects editor, sound editor and mixer, and its second co-founder. He sang for or starred in many videos before 2018, notably playing The Neighbor in RE's Hello Neighbor musical. Peter created digital effects for the series and was the primary audio engineer for each song. During RE's February 2018 live stream, Peter announced that beginning in April he would be taking a three-month hiatus, in the interest of mental health and alternative creative endeavors. He later announced that he would be officially stepping away from both Random Encounters and YouTube as a whole.
 Miss Bird is a former RE cast member who was featured in numerous musicals between 2012 and 2017. Her most notable roles for the channel included Yandere-chan in RE's Yandere Simulator musical, Circus Baby in "FNaF: Blood and Tears" and Franziska von Karma in "Phoenix Wright: The Turnabout Encounter", in addition to both large and smaller roles in many other musicals. She left RE in late 2017.

Guest stars
Lora Rivera has made appearances in multiple RE musicals, starting with "Singachu" - making her the first guest star to officially appear on the channel. Her most notable role is that of Amy Rose in RE's Sega-sponsored Sonic Boom musical. 
Brooke "Dodger" Lawson, also known by her YouTube username "PressHeartToContinue", has made several appearances on the RE channel, most notably playing herself in the "Resident Enis" series as well as the titular Eevee in "The Eevee Song". Her other roles have included Hilda Berg in Cuphead: The Musical, a scout in Medics Don't Heal Scouts!, and one of the students in "Pokémon University".
Aleu Moana is a fellow YouTuber who has been featured in musicals for the games Yandere Simulator, Pokémon GO, and HuniePop. She was also cast as The President in RE's Godzilla musical. 
Dave Bloom is best known for playing Sephiroth in RE's Final Fantasy VII parody "One-Winged Office", as well as Link in "Hyrule Warrior's Heart." 
Casey Dwyer has appeared in many RE videos over the years, and notably provides the gruff voice of RE's recurring skeleton character, "Eisenstein McBones." He has also been featured as Knuckles the Echidna in many of RE's Sonic the Hedgehog videos, and voiced characters in RE's musicals based on Pac-Man, Angry Birds, and Tetris. In 2019, Casey returned to RE as the voice of Glitchtrap in "FNAF: Web Of Lies".
Emily Dane (formerly Emily Brown) voiced Pinky in "Pac-Man: The Musical," as well as Squarella Blocki in "Tetris: The Musical." Emily later appeared once again in RE's HuniePop song, portraying the love goddess Venus.
David King has been featured repeatedly on Random Encounters over the years. His earliest starring role, as Dr. Bad-boon in the Sega-sponsored Super Monkey Ball musical, led to him becoming RE's canon Professor Oak actor for many future Pokémon projects. More recently, Dave has also played several voiceover roles, notably voicing Foxy the Pirate and Phone Guy in "FNaF: The Musical" and Blind Specter in "Cuphead the Musical". Dave runs his own Youtube Channel called Midnight Marinara, featuring Creepypasta voiceovers that several RE stars have acted in, including AJ, Miss Bird, and Gwen.
Kaela Berry has played various minor roles on Random Encounters, notably portraying Oka Ruto in "Senpai Notice Me". She and David King got married in 2019.
Anna & Sara Bartelt are twin sisters who appeared together in "Pikmin: The Musical," and again in "The Eevee Song" as Minun and Plusle respectively.  Though Anna has been featured more frequently, Sara was inducted (as the Pokémon Jigglypuff) to "join" RE's fictional "Smash Brotherhood" before her sister in a post-credits sequence following "The Eevee Song."
Justin La Torre is a cosplayer who first appeared as the Pokémon Cubone in "The Eevee Song" and has played minor roles in "Legends of Zelda: Tales of the Wind Waker" (as Skull Kid from The Legend of Zelda: Majora's Mask) and "My Date with Captain Falcon" (as a maître d'). He played the leading roles of Sally Face in "Stranger Things Have Happened: A Sally Face song" and Zed in "The Disgaea 6 Complete Musical."
Mark Fischbach is a popular sketch and gaming YouTuber, best known for his popular channel Markiplier. He first worked with Random Encounters in 2014, leading to iconic collaborations in musicals based on Five Nights at Freddy's, Cuphead, and even chess (co-starring animal actress Crystal the Monkey). Mark also teamed up with RE to film two episodes of an original series, "Resident Enis," which was partly funded by Disney XD.
Seán "Jack" McLoughlin is a popular comedic and gaming YouTuber, best known for his channel Jacksepticeye. To date, he has made one appearance on Random Encounters, voicing the Elder Kettle in "Cuphead the Musical".
Nathan "Nate" Sharp is a YouTube-based music artist best known for his channel NateWantsToBattle, where he uploads a mixture of covers and original songs. His first appearance with RE was as Professor Sycamore in "Pokémon University", and since then his most notable work with the channel has included co-starring in RE's Five Nights at Freddy's musical, voicing the character King Dice in their Cuphead song, and appearing as the titular senpai in "Senpai Notice Me." He is also well known for singing the English version of "Limit Break x Survivor", the second opening theme of Dragon Ball Super.
Morgan Want made several cameo appearances in the video "StreetPass Love", and appeared as both Osana Najimi and Mei Mio in "Senpai Notice Me".
Xander Mobus is a professional voice actor, credited with voicing Freddy Fazbear in "FNAF: The Musical," along with making a small cameo as a police officer in the musical's second and fourth episodes and (by default) its supercut. Xander later returned as Freddy Fazbear for newer FNAF musicals "Ground Zero" and "Web Of Lies".
Sarah Williams is a professional voice actress, known on RE for voicing Chica in "FNAF: The Musical." She first appeared in "Paperboy: The Musical" in 2014, and in 2017 she was cast in a major on-screen role, appearing as Wendy Oldbag in RE's Ace Attorney musical. 
Angi Viper is an online streamer and cosplayer who has done both music-based and costuming work with Random Encounters. In addition to creating the outfit worn by Dodger in "The Eevee Song," Angi has played Princess Peach in several RE musicals, building the costume herself. Despite her rise in popularity, Angi has returned for major roles in "Phoenix Wright: The Turnabout Encounter", "HuniePop: The Musical" and "Legendary Heroes", amongst others.
Matthew Patrick, known online as MatPat, is a guest YouTuber who notably appeared in multiple episodes of "FNAF: The Musical", playing the primary antagonist, Phone Guy. He also voices the titular character of RE's multiple animated Bendy and the Ink Machine musicals, as well as the characters Dr. Kahl and Wally Warbles in "Cuphead the Musical." His first appearance in any RE musical was in "How to Beat a Monkey at Chess" on Markiplier's channel. . Together with his wife, Stephanie, MatPat runs four major YouTube channels: The Game Theorists, The Film Theorists, The Food Theorists, and GTLive.
Katie Herbert is an actress who has featured in many RE musicals through the years, including notable appearances in songs based on the games Paperboy and Doki Doki Literature Club. 
OR3O (pronounced "Oreo") is a Youtube musician who starred in RE's Doki Doki Literature Club song, "Just Monika," playing Monika herself, and later played the character Kris in their Deltarune songs "Noel" and "Legendary Heroes". She has her own YouTube channel, "OR3O", where she creates vocal covers for video games.
Adriana Figueroa is a YouTube musician who has made several notable appearances on RE, including as Natsuki in "Just Monika", Cheese in "Sonic the Hedgehog: The Musical Movie Trailer", Untitled Goose Game in "Goose On Holiday: An Untitled Goose Game Song", Professor E Gadd from "Luigi's Mansion: The Musical" and Elizabeth "Lizzy" Afton in "FNAF: Web Of Lies". She also recorded vocals for the character of Baroness Von Bon Bon in RE's animated Cuphead musical . Adriana has her own YouTube channel, adrisaurus, where she produces a mix of original music and vocal covers of video game songs. 
Scott Leverett is a prop master who has appeared in many RE videos, musical and non-musical, as the stoic original character, Sweeping Man (also known as the "Minesweeper"). Because of his fabled ability to find or create rare items, as well as make emergency repairs with few resources, Scott is commonly joked to have otherworldly powers (referenced in RE's Minesweeper song, as well as by Markiplier during "FNAF: The Musical.") Scott maintains a DIY channel, "The Prop Master's Handbook", for aspiring prop-makers.
Joshua "JWittz" Wittenkeller is a YouTuber, known on RE for his role as Professor Elm in the Pokémon Professor musical, "Pokémon University".
Kial Natale, better known as "MegaSteakMan", made a cameo in "Pokémon University" as a student.
Devon Chenoweth has been a recurring cast member on RE for many years. He has played multiple characters in various musicals, including Detective Gumshoe in "Phoenix Wright: The Turnabout Encounter", Crazy Dave in "Plants vs Zombies: The Musical", and Jason Voorhees in "Friday the 13th: The Musical".
Charlie Green, known online as CG5, is a YouTube-based musician best known for both original songs and covers based around video games and other popular culture. His first on Random Encounters to date is as Michael "Mike" Afton in "FNAF: Ground Zero", He also played Berdly in NOELLE: A Deltarune Song.¨
Jules Conroy, more commonly known as FamilyJules, is a Musician on Youtube well known for his guitar covers of video game songs. His first appearance on Random Encounters was as Shadow The Hedgehog in "Sonic the Hedgehog: The Musical Movie Trailer". But he is most known for being "Daddy Dearest" in "Friday Night Funkin' the Musical" and has also played a Gardener in "Goose On Holiday: An Untitled Goose Game" and as Gooigi in "Luigi's Mansion: The Musical."
Kevin Clark, has appeared a few times on Random Encounters, he is most known for playing The Captain (Keep Talking and Nobody Explodes: The Musical) and as the Murderer (12 MINUTES THE MUSICAL: "Secret")
Genuine, aka GenuineMusic is a Music Youtuber that is mostly known for playing Ralsei (NOELLE: A Deltarune Song).
Jason Wells has been featured on multiple notable Random Encounters projects, guest-starring as Tails in "The Sonic Movie Musical Trailer" and later performing the lead role of Quentin Meyers in "Raven Brooks."
Alec Lievens, a close friend of the Random Encounters crew and part of the Youtube Channel "Blucham" has appeared as a Gun Thug (BETTER: An Uncharted/Tomb Raider Song)
Alvin Franco, a close friend of the Random Encounters crew and part of the Youtube Channel "Blucham" has appeared as PH (BETTER: An Uncharted/Tomb Raider Song)

Original characters
The Beard, an unofficial mascot for Random Encounters, is a faceless creature used as an easter egg in each RE short. It is typically seen in a long black coat and hat, with a thick yellow beard entirely obscuring its face. The Beard does not speak English but instead prefers to make "oogh" sounds. When appearing at conventions, the Beard keeps a stash of marshmallows, which it throws when spotted by fans. On YouTube, viewers often post timecodes for the Beard's appearances in each video's comments section as pointers for other viewers. Few people besides the Sweeping Man are said to have lived through a Beard attack. The character has a cameo appearance in Baldi’s Basics Plus.
Eisenstein McBones is a grouchy half-torso human skeleton (referred to as a "Stalfos" in the series). He wears various costumes and hats depending on the occasion and is most frequently associated with his boss, Ganondorf. Eisenstein often uses the term "meat-sack", both as a synonym for "human" and as an expletive.
The Sweeping Man, also known as the Minesweeper, is a mysterious, fedora-clad man who appears recurrently sweeping the floors in RE videos. Sweeping Man rarely speaks, even in live Random Encounters performances; he is stated to have supernatural capabilities and to have trained as a ninja. Allegedly, he is one of very few humans to have survived an attack from The Beard. In "Five Nights at Freddy's: The Musical", Nathan Sharp told Mark Fischbach that The Sweeping Man (who had three rounds of ammunition shot into his chest by Mark at Night 2, mistaking him as Foxy), was in a stable condition.
The Giant Crazy Snake is a bearded sock puppet, first featured in "The Legend of Ganondorf" and later in cameos in many other musicals, including as Arts and Crafters in "The Baldi's Basics Musical." Many of his appearances end with a special message, warning kids against reckless behaviors "without parental supervision". The Giant Crazy Snake is also shown to be an accomplished cage-fighter.

Corporate relationships

Sega
After "Needlemouse: The Musical" won top honors in their Sonic Birthday contest, Sega arranged to have the Random Encounters team perform an alternate version at Sonic Boom 2011, this time highlighting the Modern Sonic/Classic Sonic chemistry from Sonic Generations. Nine months later, Random Encounters co-produced a musical game trailer for the fictitious title "Sega Bass Fishing of the Dead" as part of Sega's online April Fools' prank. Sega approached the Random Encounters team a third time with the release of Rhythm Thief & the Emperor's Treasure, which became the focus of the first sponsored Encounter.

In August 2012, the Random Encounters Facebook page confirmed their involvement with Sega on a Super Monkey Ball video.

Sega collaborated yet again with Random Encounters on a musical promoting the Sonic Boom franchise when the channel uploaded a live-action musical in late 2014.

Nintendo
In 2013, Random Encounters joined the Nintendo Ambassador program as part of the Wii U Challenge.  Their first project as a brand ambassador, for the Challenge, was a musical promoting The Legend of Zelda: The Wind Waker HD.

In June 2014, Nintendo sent Random Encounters to E3, along with Black Nerd Comedy, Lamarr Wilson, and Smosh Games.  To help promote Nintendo's titles, Random Encounters produced a short musical starring Wario, which included a surprise Charles Martinet cameo at the end.

Nintendo teamed with RE again in 2015 for the launch of their new franchise, Splatoon, by helping host a multi-cam let's play tournament and inviting AJ to compete at their Mess Fest obstacle course promoting the game on the Santa Monica Pier.

For the launch of 2018's Super Smash Brothers Ultimate, Nintendo recruited Random Encounters (as well as Ryan Higa, Matthew Santoro, Kandee Johnson, Devinsupertramp, Feast of Fiction, and ESAM) to promote individual fighters from the game. Random Encounters chose to highlight the Inkling character from Splatoon with a musical number titled, "If I Was an Inkling."

Disney XD
In August 2015, Variety.com posted an online article linking Random Encounters to a Disney XD initiative labeled "Disney XD by Maker."  The crossover will reportedly seek to "find and develop video concepts for distribution on YouTube, as well as potentially DisneyXD.com and the Watch Disney XD app. It was later reported by Random Encounters that Disney XD by Maker would be funding Resident Enis 2: Monster Gulch, which was released early February 2016"

Joey Drew Studios
After releasing their Bendy and the Ink Machine musical, Random Encounters was approached by The Meatly with a request to include their song in Chapter 3 of the game. Players can uncover the song from a hidden radio.

NIS America
In May 2022, Nippon Ichi Software America offered Random Encounters a paid opportunity to create a music video promoting the release of Disgaea 6 Complete at the end of June. NIS approved a script in June with minimal changes and featured the completed musical on their social media accounts.

References

External links

American web series
Internet memes
Polaris channels
Gaming YouTubers